Pyrofomes castanopsidis is a species of polypore fungus in the family Polyporaceae. It was described as new to science in 2011 by Chinese mycologists Bao-Kai Cui and Yu-Cheng Dai. The type collections of the fungus were made in Luofushan Forest Park in Huizhou (Guangdong Province, China), where the fungus was discovered growing on a live plant of Castanopsis. The specific epithet castanopsidis refers to the genus of the host plant.

References

Polyporaceae
Fungi of China
Fungi described in 2011
Taxa named by Bao-Kai Cui
Taxa named by Yu-Cheng Dai